The Umlalazi Nature Reserve is a coastal reserve situated  from Mtunzini on the KwaZulu-Natal North Coast. Home of the palm-nut vulture, which is one of the rarest birds of prey in South Africa.

Lagoons can have crocodiles.  There are three trails in the reserve. One of which passes examples of mangrove swamps in South Africa, where several species of mangrove can be found. Another walk leads through the dune forest where bushpig, bushbuck and red, grey and blue duiker may occasionally be seen.

The third trail leads through dune forest and mangrove swamp along the edge of the river. Wildflowers and a variety of bird life can be seen. There are also colonies of fiddler crabs and mud-skippers.

References

External links
 Information about the reserve.

Nature reserves in South Africa
Mangroves
Ezemvelo KZN Wildlife Parks